Robert Charles Sampson is an American politician from Connecticut. Since 2019, he has been a member of the Connecticut State Senate representing the 16th Senate District. Previously, Sampson was a member of the Connecticut House of Representatives, representing the 80th State House District. First elected in 2010, he served four terms in the House. 

Sampson is widely known as an advocate for America’s core principles, restoring a system of limited, representative, constitutional government, protecting private contracts, and defending the natural rights of his constituents. He is an outspoken advocate in the legislature for protecting election integrity and promoting government and budgetary transparency. He has dedicated himself to shedding light on how projects will be funded and if government funds are being used for their intended purposes. He has proven himself as a leader for several causes, challenging the Lamont administration’s budgets and policies including the introduction of tolls and forced school regionalization. He is also recognized as the legislature’s defender of the second amendment and protecting parent’s rights in education.

Early life
Sampson was raised in Meriden; since 2003, he has lived in Wolcott.

Political career
Sampson, a realtor and insurance agent, was elected to the Connecticut House of Representatives, representing the 80th State House District, in 2010, and served four terms in the House. Sampson defeated incumbent Democrat John "Corky" Mazurek in 2010, and won rematches against Mazurek in 2012 and 2014. Sampson was elected in 2016 unopposed. Sampson was elected in 2018 to the State Senate from the 16th State Senate district, to an open seat vacated by Joe Markley. In November 2022, Rob Sampson was reelected by the people of the 16th Senate District to serve a third term in the State Senate representing the towns of Cheshire, Prospect, Southington, Waterbury and Wolcott.

He currently serves as the Ranking Republican on the Government Administration & Elections, Housing, and the Labor & Public Employees Committees. He is also a member of the Judiciary Committee.

Sampson is widely known as an eloquent advocate for America’s core principles, restoring our system of limited, representative, constitutional government, protecting private contracts, and defending the natural rights of his constituents. He is the most outspoken advocate in the legislature for protecting election integrity and promoting government and budgetary transparency. He has dedicated himself to shedding light on how projects will be funded and if government funds are being used for their intended purposes. He has proven himself as a leader for several causes, challenging the Lamont administration’s budgets and policies including the introduction of tolls and forced school regionalization. He is also recognized as the legislature’s defender of the second amendment and protecting parent’s rights in education. In 2021, he led the fight against the elimination of the religious exemption for vaccines in education.

Sampson opposed the "forced unionization" of childcare providers and personal care attendants and expressed support for the Supreme Court's decisions in Harris v. Quinn, which limited the power of labor unions to collect agency fees. He opposed the New Britain to Hartford Busway.

Sampson is a staunch opponent of gun control. In 2013, after the Sandy Hook Elementary School massacre, he voted against a bipartisan gun control bill; in 2015, he introduced a measure to repeal the law. In 2019, Sampson and fellow Republican John Kissel were the only senators to vote against "Ethan's Law," a safe storage law requiring gun owners to safely store firearms (whether loaded or unloaded) while not in use; the bill passed 31–2. Sampson has received awards from the Connecticut Citizens Defense League and National Rifle Association.

Sampson opposed the confirmation of Lubbie Harper Jr. (a retired Supreme Court justice) for serve as a part-time trial referee citing a "very clear and textbook case of judicial activism; Harper was confirmed 33-1.  In 2019, Sampson was one of seven state House representatives to vote against legislation banning so-called conversion therapy after offering an amendment to remove the provision that excluded the ban when no money was involved.

In 2019, Sampson was one of three state Senators who voted against a tobacco control bill raising the legal age to purchase cigarettes and other tobacco products from age 18 to age 21, after an amendment he offered carving out members of the military was voted down.

The Connecticut Conference of Municipalities in 2021 named Senator Sampson a “Legislative Champion of the Year” for his leadership in promoting transparency in government and budget matters during the 2021 legislative session.

The Conservative Political Action Coalition (CPAC) honored Senator Sampson with its “Excellence and Achievement Award” for his 2021 voting record, which supported conservative principles in key policy areas.

Sampson’s ardent support for Connecticut’s economic competitiveness and business climate earned Sampson a 100% pro-business voting record according to the Connecticut Business and Industry Association (CBIA). in 2022, he was one of only two Senators to earn this distinction.

Personal life
Robert Charles Sampson was born on August 28, 1969, in Meriden, Connecticut. He attended and graduated from Meriden Public Schools in 1987 and then attended Central Connecticut State University. He has lived in Wolcott, Connecticut since 2003.

References

1969 births
Living people
21st-century American politicians
Republican Party members of the Connecticut House of Representatives
People from Wolcott, Connecticut